The Italian Women's 2 Volleyball League, is the second highest professional women's volleyball league in Italy. The League run under the Italian Volleyball Federation rules and promotion to the Serie A1 is awarded.

History

List of winners
1996-97 Ester Napoli
1997-98 Vicenza Volley 	
1998-99 Volley Vigevano 
1999-00 AGS San Donà 
2000-01 AGIL Trecate 
2001-02 Icot Forlì
2002-03 Robursport Pesaro
2003-04 Santeramo Sport
2004-05 Pallavolo Civitanova
2005-06  River 	
2006-07 Sassuolo Volley 
2008-09 Girls Parma Volley Girls 
2009-10 Aprilia Volley 
2010-11 Volley Loreto
2011-12 Volley Loreto
2012-13 IHF
2013-14 San Casciano 
2014-15 Neruda
2015-16 Forlì Volley 2002
2016-17 Filottrano
2017-18 Adolfo Consolini

References

External links
  
  
  

Italy
Italy A2
Women's volleyball leagues in Italy